Pier Francesco Guala (15 September 1698 – 27 February 1757), also known as Pierfrancesco and Pietro Francesco, was an eighteenth-century Italian painter active for the most part in the region of his place of birth, Casale Monferrato.

Guala was the seventh of eight siblings of whom only he and a sister survived infancy. His mother died when he was five and he was brought up by his father, Lorenzo, who himself was a painter and perhaps related to the architect Sebastiano Guala.

Pier Francesco Guala died in Milan on 27 February 1757.

References

 (A bibliography for the article is provided here.)

Resources

1698 births
1757 deaths
People from Casale Monferrato
17th-century Italian painters
Italian male painters
18th-century Italian painters
Italian Baroque painters
18th-century Italian male artists